Kha with hook (Ӽ ӽ; italics: Ӽ ӽ) is a letter of the Cyrillic script. In Unicode, this letter is called "Ha with hook". Its form is derived from the Cyrillic Kha (Х х Х х) by adding a hook to the right leg.

Kha with hook is used in the alphabets of the Itelmen and Nivkh languages, where it represents the voiceless uvular fricative . Kha with hook is also used in the Aleut language (Bering dialect). It is the thirty-ninth letter of the modern Aleut alphabet.

The letter Kha with descender (Ҳ ҳ Ҳ ҳ) is sometimes used for this sound instead because of letter font support.

Computing codes

See also
Cyrillic characters in Unicode

References

External links
 Unicode proposal N2933

Cyrillic letters with diacritics
Letters with hook